William C. Henderson (September 16, 1857 in Baltimore, Maryland – October 27, 1929 in Fullerton, Maryland) was a Major League Baseball manager for the 1884 Baltimore Monumentals of the Union Association. He won 58 games and lost 47 during the one season that the Monumentals existed. The team finished in 4th place in the Association.

External links
Baseball Reference

1857 births
1929 deaths
Major League Baseball managers
Sportspeople from Baltimore